Bharati-class of interceptor boats are a series of fifteen watercraft being built by Bharati Shipyard for the Indian Coast Guard.

Description
The vessels in the series have an aluminium hull, and have a length of 28 meters, with beam of 6 meters and draught of 1.2 meters. They are powered by twin MTU Caterpillar engines having capacity of 1630 kW each. They have Articulate Surface Piercing Propulsion and can attain a speed of more than 35 knots. The vessels can perform high-speed interception, close-coast patrol, low-intensity maritime operations, search-and-rescue and surveillance. They have a complement of one officer and 12 sailors. They are being constructed as per a  contract signed with the Ministry of Defence, which was announced on 6 March 2009.

The first Bharati-class interceptor boat has IRS no. 40567 and its pennant no. is C-154. It was commissioned in Mumbai on 22 February 2013 in the presence of Maharashtra Chief Secretary J.K. Banthia and S.P.S. Basra, Inspector General (IG), Coast Guard Region (West). It was constructed by Bharati shipyards units at Vasco Da Gama

Ships of the class

See also
 Cochin Fast Patrol Vessels
 L&T fast interceptor craft
 ABG fast interceptor craft
 Swallow Craft Class
 AMPL Class

References

External links
 Rs 281 Crore defence vessel order to Bharati Shipyard

Fast attack craft of the Indian Coast Guard
Patrol boat classes
Auxiliary search and rescue ship classes